Certified Practising Marketer, or CPM, is a qualification for Australian marketers. The certification is administered by the Australian Marketing Institute.

Certification criteria
Assessments are made using quantitative and qualitative factors, including formal education, career achievements, employment history, and significant post-graduate courses.

CPM applicants must have a minimum of 5 years of marketing experience, 10 years of management experience in the marketing field or a related degree, and a commerce or business degree with a marketing major. Evidence of ongoing education and learnings (such as AMI courses or significant post graduate courses) are also taken into account.

CPM of the Year
Each year, the Australian Marketing Institute hosts the Awards for Marketing Excellence, where the nation's best performing CPM receives the Certified Practising Marketer of the Year award.

References

External links
CPM Home page

Professional associations based in Australia